Disintegrin and metalloproteinase domain-containing protein 2 or Beta-fertilin is an enzyme that in humans is encoded by the ADAM2 gene.

Function 

This gene encodes a member of the ADAM (a disintegrin and metalloprotease domain) family. Members of this family are membrane-anchored proteins structurally related to snake venom disintegrins, and have been implicated in a variety of biological processes involving cell–cell and cell–matrix interactions, including fertilization, muscle development, and neurogenesis. This member is a subunit of an integral sperm membrane heterodimer glycoprotein called fertilin, which plays an important role in sperm-egg interactions. The other subunit is ADAM1 or alpha-fertilin.

References

Further reading

External links 
 The MEROPS online database for peptidases and their inhibitors: M12.950
 

Proteases
Human proteins
EC 3.4.24